The Medal of Remembrance was an honorary award given to the people and army formations in the People's Socialist Republic of Albania.

Definition
The medal was given to the people and the army formations who took part in the National Liberation War without interruption, before July 10, 1943 (the date of formation of the General Staff of the Albanian National Liberation Army) until the country's liberation.

See also
Orders, decorations and medals of Albania

References

Awards established in 1945
Medal